Surathali Falls (Surathali Ella) is a  waterfall in Walhaputenna of Ratnapura District in Sri Lanka.

See also 
 List of waterfalls of Sri Lanka

References 

Landforms of Ratnapura District
Waterfalls in Central Province, Sri Lanka